Gela is a Southeast Solomonic language spoken in three dialects on four islands in the central Solomon Islands. Each of the dialects is very similar, differing mainly on a small number of phonological points.

Phonology

Phonemes

Consonants
Gela has the following consonant phonemes:

The fricative /z/ is realized as [ð] in alternation with a retroflex sibilant [ʐ], initially before /a/.

The Gela dominant voiced is "h" not "z". "Z" is found in Savosavo language speakers (and Bugotu and part of Guadalcanal) who also speak Gela - primarily due to their use of the Church of Melanesia Common Prayer Books and Hymns (written in Gela in the 1940s).

Vowels
Gela uses  with no contrastive vowel length.

Stress
Stress generally occurs on each word's penultimate syllable.

Sample vocabulary

Numbers

 
 
 
 
 
 
 
 
 
 
 
 
 
 
 
 
 
 
 
 
 
 
 
 
 
 
 
 
 
 
 
 
 
 
 
 
 
 
 
 
 
 
 
 
 
 
 
 
 
 

In general, for two-digit numbers, numbers are expressed as a*10+b, where a and b are numbers ranging from 1 to 9.

References

External links
Na Lei Kokoeliulivuti Portions of the Anglican Prayer Book in Gela
Gospels and the Acts of the Apostles in Gela
Paradisec open access collection of texts in Gela
Paradisec open access collection of recordings in Gela

Gela-Guadalcanal languages
Verb–object–subject languages
Languages of the Solomon Islands